Phanocelia is a genus of northern caddisflies in the family Limnephilidae. There is one described species in Phanocelia, P. canadensis.

References

Further reading

 
 
 

Trichoptera genera
Articles created by Qbugbot
Integripalpia